Dipterocarpus turbinatus (Khmer ; India gurjan, gurjun, gurgina; Tagalog ; Chinese  ; Malay language , the last an international name for Dipterocarpus wood) is a species of tree in the family Dipterocarpaceae native to north-eastern India and mainland Southeast Asia, and cultivated in surrounding regions. It is an important source of the wood known as keruing, and is often used in the plywood industry.

Distribution
Dipterocarpus turbinatus is native to an area from India (Arunachal Pradesh, Assam, Manipur, Meghalaya, Tripura, Andaman Islands, Nicobar Islands), Bangladesh, Myanmar, Thailand, Peninsular Malaysia, Borneo, Cambodia, Laos to Vietnam. It is cultivated in Indonesia (Sumatra, Java, Kalimantan), Philippines, and China (southeast Xizang, southern & western Yunnan).

Description

The trees of D. turbinatus are lofty, growing 30–45 m tall. The bark is gray or dark brown, and is shallowly longitudinally fissured and flaky. Branchlets are glabrescent. The leaf buds are falcate, with both buds and young twigs densely gray and puberulous. The stipules are 2–6 cm, densely, shortly dark grayish or dark yellow puberulous; the petiole is 2–3 cm, densely gray puberulous or glabrescent; the leaf blade is ovate-oblong, 20-30 × 8–13 cm, leathery, glabrous or sparsely stellate pubescent, lateral veins are in 15-20 pairs conspicuously raised abaxially, base rounded or somewhat cordate, margin entire or sometimes sinuate, apex acuminate or acute. The racemes are axillary, 3-6-flowered. Calyx segments are 2 linear, 3 shorter, all glabrous, outside glaucous. The stamens are about 30; anthers linear-lanceolate; connective appendages filiform. The ovary is densely pubescent; style terete, silvery gray tomentose on lower half. The nut is ovoid or narrowly ovoid, densely appressed tomentose; the calyx tube is up to 2.8 cm in diameter, glabrous, and glaucous; the winglike calyx segments are linear-lanceolate, 12-15 × ca. 3 cm, glabrous, minutely papillate near much-ramified solitary midvein. Flowering is from March to April, and fruiting occurs in June and July.

Habitat and status
It is found in mixed deciduous, evergreen and semievergreen forests. In Cambodia, one description of the habitats is wet, dense forest, sometimes on sandy, clayey soils, sometimes on red soils. The conservation status is based on the rate of habitat loss, the major threat for the species, though some subpopulations are protected in reserves.

The resin of the tree (known internationally as East Indian copaiba balsam) is used in India, where it is the source of kanyin oil and gurjun oil, and in Cambodia, where the almost solid resin is especially used to prepare torches. The red brown wood has use documented for India, Cambodia and Yunnan, China. In Cambodia, the wood is popular for sawing, woodwork, and tea-cabinet work. In herbal medicine, the plant has been traditionally used for treating gonorrhea, leprosy, psoriasis, and other skin diseases. In the home gardens of South China, it is cultivated both as a medicinal and as a perfume plant.

References

Further reading
Aubréville, A., et al., ed, 1960–, Flore du Cambodge du Laos et du Viet-Nam
Boutelje, J. B., 1980, Encyclopedia of world timbers, names and technical literature
Chinese Academy of Sciences, 1959–, Flora reipublicae popularis sinicae
FAO Regional Office for Asia and the Pacific, 1985, Dipterocarps of South Asia FAO, Bangkok
Flora of China Editorial Committee, 2007, Flora of China 13: 1–548. Science Press & Missouri Botanical Garden Press, Beijing & St. Louis
Food and Agriculture Organization of the United Nations (FAO), 2010, Ecocrop (on-line resource)
Kostermans, A.J.G.H., ed, 1987, Proceedings of the Third Round Table Conference on Dipterocarps UNESCO, Jakarta
Oldfield, S., C. Lusty, & A. MacKinven, compilers, 1998, The World List of Threatened Trees, World Conservation Press, Cambridge, England

Steenis, C. G. G. J. van, ed, 1948–, Flora malesiana

turbinatus
Flora of the Indian subcontinent
Flora of Indo-China